Vladimír Roth (born 25 June 1990) is a Czech professional ice hockey defenceman who is currently playing for HC Kometa Brno in the Czech Extraliga (ELH).

Roth played previously for London Knights.

Career statistics

Regular season and playoffs

International

References

External links
 

1990 births
Living people
HC Slavia Praha players
Czech ice hockey defencemen
HC Kometa Brno players
London Knights players
HC Bílí Tygři Liberec players
HC Oceláři Třinec players
HC Sibir Novosibirsk players
Motor České Budějovice players
Lausanne HC players
Ice hockey people from Prague
BK Havlíčkův Brod players
HC Frýdek-Místek players
Czech expatriate ice hockey players in Canada
Czech expatriate ice hockey players in Switzerland